En with left hook (Ԩ ԩ; italics: Ԩ ԩ) is a letter of the Cyrillic script.

En with left hook is used in the Orok language, where it represents the palatal nasal . When the En has a hook on the right side, Cyrillic letter En with hook (Ӈ ӈ Ӈ ӈ) it is another letter, where it represents the velar nasal .

Computing codes

See also
Ӈ ӈ : Cyrillic letter En with hook
Ɲ ɲ : Latin letter N with left hook
Cyrillic characters in Unicode

References

Cyrillic letters with diacritics
Letters with hook